Adam Warwick (born 21 January 1977) is an Australian former rugby league footballer who played for the North Queensland Cowboys and Brisbane Broncos in the National Rugby League. He primarily played .

Playing career
In Round 7 of the 1997 Super League season, Warwick made his first grade debut in the North Queensland Cowboys 4–6 loss to the Western Reds at the WACA Ground. He scored his first try six weeks later in the Cowboys' Round 13 loss to the Canterbury Bulldogs. In 1998, Warwick played seven games in his final season with the Cowboys.

In 1999, Warwick joined the Brisbane Broncos, playing for their Queensland Cup feeder club, the Toowoomba Clydesdales. In Round 18 of the 2000 NRL season, he played his only game for the Broncos, starting on the wing in a 22–26 loss to the Newcastle Knights. On 19 August 2000, he started on the wing in Toowoomba's 6–14 loss to the Redcliffe Dolphins in the Queensland Cup Grand Final.

Statistics

Super League/NRL
 Statistics are correct to the end of the 2000 season

References

1977 births
Living people
Australian rugby league players
North Queensland Cowboys players
Brisbane Broncos players
Toowoomba Clydesdales players
Rugby league wingers
Rugby league fullbacks